Bartholomew Gill was the pen name of Mark C. McGarrity (July 22, 1943 – July 4, 2002), an Irish-American crime fiction and mystery novelist and newspaper features writer and columnist writing on nature and outdoor recreation for The Star-Ledger.  He was the author of 22 mystery novels, set in Ireland, and featuring a "resourceful police detective named Peter McGarr." For his pen name, McGarrity used the name of his maternal grandfather, Bartholomew Gill, who "was a great storyteller." McGarrity wrote five novels and a work of nonfiction under his real name, and his writings for the Star-Ledger were published under his true name.

Biography

Mark C. McGarrity was born on July 22, 1943 in Holyoke, Massachusetts, McGarrity received a bachelor's degree from Brown University in Providence, Rhode Island, and a master's degree from Trinity College, Dublin. His marriage to Margaret McGarrity ended in divorce.

McGarrity died on July 4, 2002, aged 58, from injuries sustained in a fall at his Morristown, New Jersey home. He had forgotten his keys and attempted to enter his home by climbing through a window. He was survived by a daughter, Madeleine, and a brother, George. He was interred in Newton Cemetery, in Newton, New Jersey, where his gravestone identifies him by both his real name and pen name, and as "author, outdoorsman, Maddie's father".

Works
 Under the name "Mark C. McGarrity"
 1973: Little Augie’s Lament
 1973: Lucky Shuffles
 1981: A Passing Advantage
 1990: Neon Caesar
 1991: White Rush/Green Fire
 1993: A Guide to Mental Retardation: A Comprehensive Resource for Parents, Teachers, and Helpers Who Know, Love, and Care for People With Mental Retardation

 Under the name "Bartholomew Gill"
 1977: McGarr and the Politician’s Wife (aka The Death of an Irish Politician)
 1977: McGarr and the Sienese Conspiracy (aka The Death of an Irish Consul)
 1978: McGarr on the Cliffs of Moher (aka The Death of an Irish Lass)
 1979: McGarr at the Dublin Horse Show (aka The Death of an Irish Tradition)
 1983: McGarr and the P.M. of Belgrave Square
 1984: McGarr and the Method of Descartes
 1986: McGarr and the Legacy of the Woman Scorned
 1989: The Death of a Joyce Scholar
 1992: The Death of Love
 1993: Death on a Cold, Wild River
 1995: The Death of an Ardent Bibliophile
 1996: The Death of an Irish Sea Wolf
 1997: The Death of an Irish Tinker (aka Death of a Busker King)
 2000: The Death of an Irish Lover
 2001: The Death of an Irish Sinner
 2002: Death in Dublin

See also
 List of pen names

References

1943 births
2002 deaths
20th-century American novelists
21st-century American novelists
American crime fiction writers
American male novelists
Alumni of Trinity College Dublin
Writers from Holyoke, Massachusetts
Novelists from Massachusetts
Burials in New Jersey
20th-century American male writers
21st-century American male writers
Brown University alumni
20th-century pseudonymous writers
21st-century pseudonymous writers